The Quebrada Valverde salamander (Bolitoglossa diminuta) is a species of salamander in the family Plethodontidae.
It is endemic to Costa Rica.
Its natural habitat is subtropical or tropical moist montane forests.

References

Bolitoglossa
Endemic fauna of Costa Rica
Taxonomy articles created by Polbot
Amphibians described in 1976